Kajsa "Ekis" Ekman is a Swedish author and journalist. She has written four books, translated into several languages, about capitalism, economic crises, and women's rights. She lectures internationally on prostitution and surrogacy. She is a regular contributor to the Swedish newspaper Aftonbladet and is a columnist in the Norwegian newspaper Klassekampen. She has also contributed to Kathemerini.

Books

Her book Being and Being Bought, compares the sex industry and the surrogacy industry, and how they both commodify women's bodies. It argues that both industries are at the intersection between capitalism and patriarchy. It criticizes the notion of sex work as being an unholy alliance between the neoliberal right and the postmodern left, used to legitimize the sex industry. After two years of investigating so-called "trade unions for sex workers" in Europe, often undercover, she notices that they in many cases are funded by pimps, states, and academics, and have very little to do with labor struggle. The book has been translated into French, English, Spanish, and German. Ekman has given talks at the European Parliament about surrogacy and prostitution, calling for an abolition of both. 

Her book Stolen Spring describes the eurocrisis as seen from Athens, and the way in which it affected the Greek economy. Ekman criticizes the view that the eurocrisis was caused by the Greek workers, and instead traces it back to changes in capitalism and the construction of the euro as a currency that does not benefit economies of southern Europe. She was given the prize "Swedish-Greek of the Year" 2016 for her solidarity with Greece.

In 2021 she published the book Om könets existens about the "new discourse around gender" which according to Ekman is idealist as opposed to a dialectical-materialist view on sex. The book was both praised by feminists such as Yvonne Hirdman and editor-in-chief Heidi Avellan, as well as criticized for relying on far-right "fake news sources" and depicting trans women as a threat. Morgenbladet described the book's anti-trans rhetoric as "abhorrent" and said that it "it is debatable whether this book deserves any discussion at all." Maria Horvei wrote that Ekman's "onesided" book argues against strawmen. The Swedish Federation for Lesbian, Gay, Bisexual and Transgender Rights published a book titled 100 fel i 'Om könets existens' that argued that her book contained numerous inaccuracies and dubious sources.

Pro-Palestine activism
She was  a participant in the 2015 Free Gaza Flottilla whose aim was to break the siege of Gaza and deliver humanitarian aid. She, along with Dror Feiler, was imprisoned by the Israeli military. She considers Israel to be a country based on "ethnic cleansing and apartheid".

Other topics
Ekman was one of the speakers at the 2014 Festival of Dangerous Ideas. In her Ted Talk, "Everybody talks about Capitalism, but what is it?", she speaks about the free market as a useful tool, but capitalism as a force unable of moral responsibility, and plan for the climate, the country, and the world. She suggests regulation of the finance sector to avoid crises, and suggests "democracy in all sectors of society, also in the working place".

Awards and honours 

 2010 – The Robespierre Prize
 2016 – Sara Lidman-priset
 2020 – The Lenin Award (Sweden)

References

External links 

1980 births
Living people
Socialist feminists
Swedish anti-capitalists
Swedish feminists
Swedish women writers
Feminism and transgender